Carleton Hoffner is an American figure skater who competed in both ice dance and pairs with partner Anne Davies.  They won the dance title at the 1946 U.S. Figure Skating Championships and won the bronze medal in pairs at the 1949 World Figure Skating Championships.

Results
(Pairs with Davies)

(Ice Dance with Davies)

References

American male ice dancers
American male pair skaters
Living people
World Figure Skating Championships medalists
Year of birth missing (living people)